Grm is a small settlement south of Rašica in the traditional region of Lower Carniola in central Slovenia. It is part of the Municipality of Velike Lašče and is included in the Central Slovenia Statistical Region.

References

External links
Grm on Geopedia

Populated places in the Municipality of Velike Lašče